The Escabrosa Limestone is a geologic formation in Arizona left behind from an ancient sea from some 330 million years ago. Layers of the sediment left by the sea hardened into a what is called a "strata." It has preserved fossils dating back to the Mississippian subperiod.

Rainwater has seeped into the limestone, eroding and dissolving the rock into walkable passageways. These are called the "Kartchner Caverns" and are considered a living cavern since they are still growing.

See also

 List of fossiliferous stratigraphic units in Arizona
 Paleontology in Arizona

References
 

Carboniferous Arizona
Carboniferous southern paleotropical deposits